Josef Korčák (17 December 1921 – 5 October 2008) was a Czech politician who served as a Prime Minister of the Czech Socialist Republic from 1970 to 1987. He was the longest serving Czech Prime Minister.

Biography
He was born in Holštejn. He became metal turner. He worked in Brno armory form 1937 to 1948. In 1948 he became active in politics.

He became Prime Minister in 1970 when he replaced Josef Kempný. He remained in this position until 1987 when he was replaced by Ladislav Adamec. Kočák was excluded from KSČ in 1990. He died in 2008.

References

1921 births
2008 deaths
People from Blansko District
Members of the Central Committee of the Communist Party of Czechoslovakia
Government ministers of Czechoslovakia
Members of the National Assembly of Czechoslovakia (1960–1964)
Members of the National Assembly of Czechoslovakia (1964–1968)
Members of the Chamber of the People of Czechoslovakia (1969–1971)
Members of the Chamber of the People of Czechoslovakia (1971–1976)
Members of the Chamber of the People of Czechoslovakia (1976–1981)
Members of the Chamber of the People of Czechoslovakia (1981–1986)
Members of the Chamber of the People of Czechoslovakia (1986–1990)
Czech communists
Prime Ministers of the Czech Socialist Republic
Communist Party of Czechoslovakia prime ministers